RTTS (Real-Time Technology Solutions, Inc.) is a professional services organization that provides software quality outsourcing, training, and resources for business applications. With offices in New York City, Philadelphia, Atlanta, and Phoenix, RTTS serves mid-sized to large corporations throughout North America. RTTS uses the software quality and test solutions from IBM, Hewlett-Packard Enterprise, Microsoft and other vendors and open source tools to perform software performance testing, functional test automation, big data testing, data warehouse/ETL testing, mobile application testing, security testing and service virtualization.

History 
Real-Time Technology Solutions, Inc. (RTTS) was founded in New York in 1996. RTTS began by supporting test automation tools from SQA, Inc., a Boston-based publicly traded firm that specialized in the relatively new field of automated software quality (ASQ).

In 1997, Rational Software, Inc., a Cupertino, California, firm specializing in products that model and aid in software development, acquired SQA, Inc. RTTS joined the Rational value-added reseller (VAR) program.

RTTS supports testing solutions from Rational Software (now a part of IBM), Hewlett-Packard Enterprise, Microsoft, and open source solutions such as Selenium (software), Appium (mobile testing) and Apache JMeter.

RTTS clients include Fortune 500 and small and medium-sized businesses in vertical markets that include pharmaceuticals, banking, insurance, brokerage, health care, software vendors, government agencies, media, telecommunications, professional services, retail, higher education, transportation, and entertainment.

Alliances 
RTTS has partnership agreements with the following companies to provide software sales, product training, and consulting:

IBM (through the Rational Software and Information Management brands)
Hewlett Packard Enterprise (the Mercury Interactive test tools)
Microsoft  (the Visual Studio Team System: Test Edition; now Azure DevOps)
Oracle
Teradata
HortonWorks
Cloudera
MongoDB
Sauce Labs

Services 
Managed testing services, test planning, software performance testing, load testing, functional test automation, big data testing, data warehouse testing, business intelligence report testing, DevOps/DevTest, application security testing, exploratory testing, training services.

Onshore Outsourcing 
In October 2003 RTTS started an on-shore outsourced testing service that provides software quality and automated testing services using American programmers working out of offices in the US.  The model differs from offshoring since engineers work in a similar time zone with no language barriers and no visa issues. It has been rebranded as Testing in the Cloud.

Software 
In 2008 RTTS spun off TOMOS Software, LLC. TOMOS is software as a service (SaaS) for Application lifecycle management. TOMOS is role-based, with roles defined for project manager, business analyst, developer and tester. TOMOS has modules for requirements management, test authoring, a test execution engine, defect tracking, version/build management, and collaboration.

In 2010 RTTS began work on an enterprise test tool for data testing.  QuerySurge was released in early 2012. QuerySurge automates big data testing, data warehouse and ETL testing, data interface testing, data migration testing and database upgrade testing.

Awards 
 Named 2009 voke Innovator by voke, Inc.
Named Gartner Cool Vendor in Application Development, 2009, for application lifecycle management platform

References

Information technology companies of the United States
Consulting firms established in 1996
Information technology consulting firms of the United States
Business services companies of the United States